The Miss Universo Paraguay 2020 pageant was held at Veranda at Resort Yacht y Golf Club Paraguayo on December 3, 2020, to select the Paraguayan representative to Miss Universe. It was streamed live on the organizer's social media pages.
Ketlin Lottermann, Miss Universo Paraguay 2019, crowned Vanessa Castro as the new Miss Universo Paraguay 2020, givin her the right to compete at Miss Universe 2020.

Results

Special Awards
Miss Social Media: Yenny Benítez
Best Face: Sandra Sanabria
Miss Elegance: Sara Ramos
Miss Photogenich: Keren Gavilán
Miss Sympathy: Viviana Vera
Miss Silhouette: Cindy Aquino

Contestants
There were 10 official contestants.

See also
Miss Paraguay
Miss Universe 2020

References

External links
Promociones Gloria, holder of the franchises.
Reinas de Belleza del Paraguay Facebook Page

2020 beauty pageants
2020 in Paraguay
2020
December 2020 events in South America